Friar Park is a Victorian neo-Gothic mansion in Henley-on-Thames, England, built in 1889. It was originally owned by eccentric lawyer Sir Frank Crisp and purchased in January 1970 by English rock musician and former Beatle George Harrison. The site covers about 62 acres (25 hectares). Features include caves, grottoes, underground passages, a multitude of garden gnomes, and an Alpine rock garden with a scale model of the Matterhorn. Though rumour and tabloid reports often claim the building has 120 rooms, this was denied by the current owner, Olivia Harrison, while speaking to NPR Fresh Air in March 2004, at which time she clarified the number was somewhere around 30.

Overview
The main house is listed Grade II on the National Heritage List, and the gardens of Friar Park are also listed Grade II on the Register of Historic Parks and Gardens. In addition to the main house, the Lower Lodge, Middle Lodge, and Upper Lodge are all also individually listed Grade II. The entrance walls and piers of the Lower Lodge, and the railed wall piers and gates of the Middle Lodge are also listed Grade II.

Since the early 1970s, the property has become synonymous with the former Beatle's home studio, known as FPSHOT (i.e., "Friar Park Studio, Henley-On-Thames"). Harrison biographer Alan Clayson has described the Friar Park estate as being "as synonymous with his name as the Queen's with Windsor Castle".

Harrison put the whole property up as collateral in order to fund the Monty Python comedy team's movie Life of Brian, after their original backers, EMI, pulled out at the last minute. As a huge fan of the Pythons, Harrison simply wanted to get to see the film − something that his friend Eric Idle has described as "the most expensive cinema ticket in movie history".

History
The Friar Park estate was owned by Sir Frank Crisp from 1889 until his death in 1919. The property was then sold at an auction to Sir Percival David. Following their divorce, Lady David moved into the Coachman's Cottage on the south-west corner of the property when the rest of the estate was donated for the use of nuns belonging to the Salesians of Don Bosco order. The nuns ran a local school in Henley, the Sacred Heart School, but, by the late 1960s, Friar Park was in a state of disrepair and due to be demolished.

George Harrison and FPSHOT
In early 1972, Harrison installed a 16-track tape-based recording studio in a guest suite, which, at one point, was superior to the one at EMI's Abbey Road Studios. By 1974, the facility had become the recording headquarters for his record label, Dark Horse Records. The album covers for projects Harrison recorded there usually mentioned "F.P.S.H.O.T." – Friar Park Studio, Henley-on-Thames. These include the bulk of his own albums, from 1973's Living in the Material World onwards; among them, Dark Horse, Thirty Three & 1/3, George Harrison, Cloud Nine and Brainwashed. 

In addition to Harrison's solo albums, overdubs for the two Traveling Wilburys releases and the recording and filming of The Beatles' 1995 Anthology project were also recorded at Friar Park Studio Henley-on-Thames. In 1996, Harrison recorded and produced the critically acclaimed album Chants of India for Ravi Shankar at FPSHOT. Interviews with family and friends for posthumous documentaries such as 2003's Concert for George, the 2005 Concert for Bangladesh DVD release, and Martin Scorsese's George Harrison: Living in the Material World in 2011 were all conducted at FPSHOT or just downstairs in the main part of the house.

Besides the records by Harrison or artists he produced, the studio was also used by Shakespears Sister to record their 1992 album Hormonally Yours.

The gardens
In the foreword to Harrison's 1980 memoir I, Me, Mine, Derek Taylor writes of Harrison's purchase of Friar Park: "It is a dream on a hill and it came, not by chance, to the right man at the right time."

Friar Park has extensive gardens and water features designed by Henry Ernest Milner for Crisp, including a grotto, and stones just underneath the surface of the pond (providing a walking-on-water illusion). The park also includes a sandstone replica of the Matterhorn Reflecting Crisp's sense of humour, among the statuary is a monk holding a frying pan with holes in it, and a plaque reading "Two Holy Friars". The year Harrison and his first wife, Pattie Boyd, moved in, he was photographed among four garden gnomes located on the main lawn for the cover of All Things Must Pass, and again with his father Harry six years later, with the photo appearing inside the gatefold cover of Thirty Three & 1/3.

Harrison immortalised the grand building and its surrounds in his 1976 song "Crackerbox Palace", which was his nickname for the mansion (after Lord Buckley's home in California). The All Things Must Pass track "Ballad of Sir Frankie Crisp (Let It Roll)" was inspired by Friar Park's history, and the lyrics of later songs such as "Ding Dong, Ding Dong" and "The Answer's at the End" directly quote from the many carvings around the property. His humorous video clips for the likes of "Ding Dong, Ding Dong", "True Love", and "Crackerbox Palace" were all shot within the gardens and grounds of Friar Park, as were the album covers for some of his FPSHOT-recorded Dark Horse acts − Splinter's The Place I Love and the album Ravi Shankar's Music Festival from India being the most obvious.

Harrison and his second wife Olivia restored the gardens. Until his death in November 2001, he loved tending to them personally − an activity that a visiting Rolling Stone journalist in 1987 deemed a "decidedly un-rock-star-ish pastime" − and among the groundskeepers were his older brothers Peter and Harry. George's son Dhani would later recall for the Scorsese documentary: "He'd garden at night-time until midnight. He'd be out there squinting because he could see, at midnight, the moonlight and shadows, and that was his way of not seeing the weeds or imperfections that would plague him during the day ..." Talking of the tranquility he felt at Friar Park, Harrison once said: "Sometimes I feel like I'm actually on the wrong planet, and it's great when I'm in my garden. But the minute I go out the gate I think: 'What the hell am I doing here?'"

Security concerns
During Crisp's time at Friar Park, the grounds were regularly open to the public. Following the murder of John Lennon, Harrison's Beatles bandmate, in December 1980, the gates were locked and security features such as fences and video cameras were installed. Despite these measures, an intruder, Michael Abram, broke into the residence in the early hours of 30 December 1999, attacking Harrison and his wife Olivia, leaving Harrison with five stab wounds and a punctured lung.

See also
12 Arnold Grove, Harrison birthplace and boyhood home 
Kinfauns - earlier Harrison home

References

Bibliography

Further reading

External links

Friar Park historical and contemporary photographs and illustrations
Friar Park photographs
Friar Park photographs and comments

Video with discussion of friend on George Harrison buying Friar Park

1875 establishments in England
Country houses in Oxfordshire
Gardens in Oxfordshire
Gothic Revival architecture in Oxfordshire
Grade II listed buildings in Oxfordshire
Grade II listed parks and gardens in Oxfordshire
Grade II listed houses
George Harrison
Henley-on-Thames
Houses completed in 1889